Palo Alto Airport,  is an airport  west of Lolol, a town in the O'Higgins Region of Chile.

See also

Transport in Chile
List of airports in Chile

References

External links
OpenStreetMap - Palo Alto
OurAirports - Palo Alto
FallingRain - Palo Alto Airport

Airports in Chile
Airports in O'Higgins Region